is a former Japanese football player. He played for Japan national team.

Club career
Okamoto was born on December 14, 1933. When he was a Kwansei Gakuin University student, he won 1953 and 1955 Emperor's Cup at All Kwangaku was consisted of his alma mater Kwansei Gakuin University players and graduates. After graduating from university, he played for Hitachi.

National team career
On January 2, 1955, when Okamoto was a Kwansei Gakuin University student, he debuted for Japan national team against Burma. He played 5 games for Japan in 1955.

National team statistics

References

External links
 
 Japan National Football Team Database

1933 births
Living people
Kwansei Gakuin University alumni
Japanese footballers
Japan international footballers
Kashiwa Reysol players
Association football forwards